The Crook and the Girl is a 1913 American drama film featuring Harry Carey.

Cast
 Lionel Barrymore as The Nephew
 Harry Carey as The Crook
 Claire McDowell as The Uncle's Adopted Daughter
 Hector Dion as The Butler
 William J. Butler as The Lawyer

See also
 List of American films of 1913
 Harry Carey filmography
 Lionel Barrymore filmography

References

External links

1913 films
American silent short films
American black-and-white films
1913 drama films
1913 short films
Films directed by Anthony O'Sullivan
Silent American drama films
1910s American films